Korobkov or Korobkow ( from коробка, meaning box) is a Russian surname. Its feminine counterpart is Korobkova or Korobkowa. It may refer to:
Aleksandr Korobkov (1897–1941), Soviet general
Pavel Korobkov (born 1990), Russian basketballer
Pavel Terentyevich Korobkov (1909–1978), Soviet flying ace
Nina Korobkova (born 1926), Russian rower

See also
Korobkova House

Russian-language surnames